Fairview, Virginia may refer to:
Fairview, Essex County, Virginia
Fairview, Fairfax, Virginia
Fairview, Fairfax County, Virginia
Fairview, Mecklenburg County, Virginia
Fairview, Northampton County, Virginia
Fairview, Page County, Virginia
Fairview, Scott County, Virginia
Fairview, Wythe County, Virginia